Keewaydin is a neighborhood in the Nokomis community in Minneapolis, Minnesota. Its boundaries are Minnehaha Parkway to the north, 34th Avenue to the east, 54th Street to the south, and Cedar Avenue to the west. The neighborhood contains the majority of Lake Nokomis. It shares a neighborhood organization with the Minnehaha, Morris Park, and Wenonah neighborhoods, which are collectively referred to as Nokomis East and served by the Nokomis East Neighborhood Association (NENA).

References

External links 
 Minneapolis Neighborhood Profile - Keewaydin
 Nokomis East Neighborhood Association

Neighborhoods in Minneapolis